Huang Ai-chun (born 16 May 1974) is a Taiwanese judoka. She competed in the women's lightweight event at the 1996 Summer Olympics.

References

1974 births
Living people
Taiwanese female judoka
Olympic judoka of Taiwan
Judoka at the 1996 Summer Olympics
Place of birth missing (living people)
Taiwanese female sport wrestlers
World Wrestling Championships medalists
20th-century Taiwanese women